Ryan Gifford (born March 10, 1989) is an American professional stock car racing driver. A former development driver for Richard Childress Racing and a former member of NASCAR NEXT. He last drove the No. 2 Toyota Camry for Rev Racing in the regional K&N Pro Series East as a member of NASCAR's Drive for Diversity, and has made starts in the national Xfinity Series for RCR and Biagi-DenBeste Racing. Gifford is the first African-American driver to win a pole in the K&N East series, and works in the shop of Team Dillon Racing.

Early life
Gifford is the son of Allen Burnette and Michelle Gifford, who died in 2010. Ryan also has a half-brother, Jabryle Hill. Ryan's grandfather Farrell Gifford was a drag racer, who introduced him to racing at age six. Gifford graduated from Franklin County High School and attended Middle Tennessee State University.

Gifford began his career in go-karts at the age of eight, competing in the World Karting Association from 2000 to 2004 and winning two track championships and finishing 3rd in national standings in his final season. In 2005 at age 15, he began the transition to stock car racing in dirt late models, earning 3 poles and four top 5s in his first season. In 2006, Gifford was noticed by Mike Dillon, the son-in-law of Richard Childress and RCR's general manager. Gifford would move into the Dillon's North Carolina household in 2008 to compete for RCR and Team Dillon Racing on both dirt and asphalt, registering 3 wins and 20 top 10's in 29 starts that season. In 2009, Gifford made four starts in the K&N Pro Series East and one in the West Series in a No. 29 Shell/Pennzoil Chevrolet for RCR. Gifford scored four top 5s including two second-place finishes.

K&N Pro Series East

In 2010, Gifford one of eleven young drivers selected for NASCAR's recently revamped Drive for Diversity program, and would pilot the #2 Chevrolet in the K&N Pro Series East. Gifford raced alongside future national series drivers Darrell Wallace Jr. and Paulie Harraka. Gifford earned 4 top fives in the 10 race schedule, finishing 9th in points. Gifford also won a pole at Martinsville Speedway, the first pole by an African American in the series' history. Gifford returned in 2011 and 2012, posting a total of seven top 10s in 26 races, and finishing 10th and 11th in points respectively.

In 2013, Gifford was named part of the NASCAR NEXT program. Gifford was also joined by a new crew chief, veteran race car driver Mark Green. He won his first race, the Blue Ox 100, on April 27 at Richmond International Raceway. Gifford started 11th and worked his way to the front, beating Brandon Gdovic and Cole Custer on a late-race restart. Gifford would finish 11th in points with four top 5s and six top 10s.

After the race at Loudon, New Hampshire in July 2014, Gifford was fined $1,000 for an altercation with another driver. Gifford was also placed on probation for the rest of the year.

NASCAR Nationwide Series
In August 2013, Gifford made his national series debut at Iowa Speedway for Richard Childress Racing in their No. 33 Menards Chevrolet, coming from the 23rd starting position to finish 9th. In 2014, Gifford was signed to run two races for Biagi-DenBeste Racing at Iowa in May and Kentucky in June. Gifford finished 20th in his only appearance at Iowa.

Motorsports career results

NASCAR
(key) (Bold – Pole position awarded by qualifying time. Italics – Pole position earned by points standings or practice time. * – Most laps led.)

Nationwide Series

K&N Pro Series East

Camping World West Series

References

External links
 

1989 births
Living people
People from Winchester, Tennessee
African-American racing drivers
NASCAR drivers
21st-century African-American sportspeople
20th-century African-American people
Richard Childress Racing drivers